George Kinsey (27 November 1866 – 1936) was a professional footballer, who was capped four times by the England national football team, and also won the FA Cup in 1893 with Wolverhampton Wanderers.

Kinsey was born in Burton upon Trent, and began playing with his home town teams Burton Crusaders and Burton Swifts, before joining Birmingham St George's. In 1891 he moved to Wolverhampton Wanderers, where he played 73 times in The Football League, and took part in the 1893 FA Cup Final.

He played for Aston Villa, Derby County and Notts County in The Football League between 1894 and 1897, before joining Bristol Eastville Rovers. He played in the Western League, Birmingham & District League and Southern League for Rovers, who were renamed Bristol Rovers at the end of his first year with the club, and he made five appearances in the latter competition.

He returned to his home town to end his career, firstly re-joining Burton Swifts in 1900, and later moving on to Burton Early Closing. He died in the final quarter of 1936 at the age of 69.

Sources

External links

1866 births
1911 deaths
Sportspeople from Burton upon Trent
English footballers
Association football midfielders
English Football League players
Southern Football League players
England international footballers
Burton Swifts F.C. players
Wolverhampton Wanderers F.C. players
Aston Villa F.C. players
Derby County F.C. players
Notts County F.C. players
Bristol Rovers F.C. players
Birmingham St George's F.C. players
FA Cup Final players